is a multilingual FM radio station owned and operated by FM 802 Co., Ltd. The station broadcasts on the 76.5 MHz FM to the Kansai area which includes Osaka, Kyoto, Hyōgo(city of Kobe), Nara, Shiga, and Wakayama prefectures. FM Cocolo's former owner  was based at the Osaka Prefectural Government Sakishima Building (Cosmo Tower) in Suminoe-ku, Osaka, Japan.

FM Cocolo is part of the Megalopolis Radio Network (MegaNet), linking Japan's international FM radio stations (InterFM, FM Cocolo, RADIOi and LoveFM), covering more than 65% of Japan's population.

Most of the programs on FM Cocolo are in English and Japanese, with programs in Chinese, French, Filipino, Hindi, Indonesian, Japanese, Korean, Malaysian, Portuguese, Sinhalese, Spanish, Thai and Vietnamese air in allocated timeslots.

Branding
 is a Japanese term for "heart", and also stands for Cooperation, Communication, Love.

History 
FM Cocolo began broadcasting in October 16, 1995.

On April 1, 2012, FM802 Co., Ltd., through its subsidiary 802 MediaWorks, bought Kansai Intermedia, making FM Cocolo its sister station.

Slogan 
 "Whole Earth Station"
 "The Heart of the City"

Disc Jockeys
 Anin (Indonesia)
 Anung (Indonesia)
 Toshihide Baba
 Don Beaver (also a navigator for sister station FM802)
 Mayumi Chiwaki
 Chris
 Cindy (Philippines)
 Eric
 Masayuki Furuya
 Gary
 Setsubai Haku
 Huy (Vietnam)
 Namiko Ikeda
 Shozo Ise
 Yukio Iwata
 Wolfman Jack
 Janne
 Kong Kamasami
 Yukinobu Kami 
 KAN
 Matsuo Khanittha (Thailand)
 Kim, Hee-tae (South Korea)
 Kim, Soo-jung (South Korea)
 Kiyomi
 Mamiko Kotani
 Li, Jia (PR China)
 Maxie (Sri Lanka)
 Meme
 Mina (Philippines)
 Yoshitaka Minami
 Monica
 Mylan (Vietnam)
 Mitsuko Nagao
 Kaname Nemoto
 Karen Okubo
 Masaji Otsuka
 Rahman (Malaysia)
 Rogerio (Portugal)
 Roxana (Spain)
 Sandya (Sri Lanka)
 Sirinada (Sri Lanka)
 Sunny (India)
 Masayuki "Mark E" Taniguchi (also a navigator for sister station FM802)
 Ryudo Uzaki
 Satomi Wakura
 Xiaochen (PR China)

See also 
 MegaNet
 InterFM
 Love FM
 Radio neo
 FM802

External links 
 Official website 
 Multilingual Support System, Useful for Mid- to Long-Term Stay, Brand-new Osaka, Osaka Prefectural Government

Radio stations in Japan
Radio in Japan
Companies based in Osaka Prefecture
Mass media in Osaka
Filipino-language radio stations